Kaga Create Co., Ltd. was a Japan-based video game developing and publishing division of Kaga Electronics.

The company initially released games for the PC Engine (known as the TurboGrafx-16 in North America). It later released titles for a wide array of gaming systems, including the Nintendo Entertainment System, Game Boy, Super NES, Dreamcast, 3DO, PlayStation, Sega Saturn, and PC-FX. The company's releases mostly stopped around 2005, with their final games primarily being re-releases of PC Engine titles on the Wii Virtual Console.

History
Kaga's video game division was founded in 1988-06-22 under the name 'Naxat'. The company is named from the backwards spelling of Taxan, which is a brand owned by its parent company.

To compete with Hudson's own Caravan video game marathon competitions in the late 80s, NAXAT held a similar competition dubbed Summer Carnival. The game for which the company is best known, Summer Carnival '92: Recca, commonly abbreviated to simply Recca, was created for this competition and named after it. The Summer Carnival was held for only three years and was not as successful as Hudson's.

In 1998, the company was renamed to Kaga Tech Co., Ltd, but the video games were still sold under the Naxat Soft brand.

On 1999-10-18, Digital Gain Co., Ltd. was established, which was responsible for developing Naxat Soft titles.

On 2005-02-24, Kaga Electronics announced the merger of KAGA TECH CO., LTD. and KANTO AUTOMATION Co., Ltd., which would take effect on 2005-04-01. Under the terms of merger, the Amusement Machines Development Business of KAGA TECH CO., LTD. would be transferred to the Specific Industry Sales Headquarters of KAGA ELECTRONICS, the Entrust Business for Game Software Development to the Digital Media Lab., Inc. (100% subsidiary of Kaga Electronics), and the Game Software Development Business to the subsidiary DIGITAL GAIN CO., LTD.

On 2007-04-25, Kaga Electronics announced Digital Gain Co., Ltd. would be renamed to Kaga Create Co., Ltd., which took effect on 2007-5-1. At the time of renaming, the company's business was expanded to graphic design, web page production, new source production, merchandise development, event promotion. It developed software for Pionesoft, Alchemist, Milestone Inc.

Summer Carnival

In 1991, Spriggan for the PC Engine CD system became the first competition game for Naxat.

In 1992, Recca for the Famicom and Alzadick for the PC Engine CD were the competition games.

In 1993, Nexzr Special for the PC Engine CD system was the game featured the last time Naxat held its Summer Carnival.

Subsidiaries
CyberFront Corporation (株式会社サイバーフロント): In April 2010, Kaga Electronics Co., Ltd. acquired 51% of CyberFront Corporation, and became a subsidiary of Kaga Electronics. In March 2013, Kaga Electronics Co., Ltd. acquired the remaining shares of CyberFront Corporation. In 2013-12-19, Kaga Electronics Co., Ltd. announced the dissolution of CyberFront Corporation following the discovery of inadequacies of CyberFront's intellectual property contracts and claims by business partners denying existence of such rights, and CyberFront Corporation founder Shinji Fujiwara's lack of cooperation in the investigation. As a result of dissolution, sales of Saints Row IV, Europa Universalis IV, WRC 4: FIA World Rally Championship were cancelled; and the sales of Operation Abyss: New Tokyo Legacy was indefinitely delayed. Sales of titles at PlayStation Store was terminated from 2014-01-21 to 2014-01-31, followed by sales termination at Xbox 360 Marketplace from 2014-01-25.

See also

KID, whose assets CyberFront purchased in February 2007.
Mages (formerly 5pb.), who acquired CyberFront.

References

External links
Kaga Create page
Moby Games: Naxat Soft
GameFAQs
Kaga Electronics profile on Kaga Create, English version
List of Naxat Soft games
List of Kaga Tech games

Software companies based in Tokyo
Video game companies established in 1988
Video game companies disestablished in 2015
Defunct video game companies of Japan
Video game publishers